Elinor Bellingham-Smith (28 December 1906 – 4 November 1988) was a British painter of landscapes and still life. Her paintings are in the collections of Tate, Museums Sheffield, the Government Art Collection, Arts Council Collection and other museums and galleries.

Early life
Elinor Bellingham-Smith was born in London on 28 December 1906 to Guy and Ellen (Nell) Buxton Bellingham-Smith, who were married in 1901. Her father collected drawings and prints and published a catalog of his collection of Old Master drawings and those of Evelyn L. Englehearts and Thomas R. Berney. was a registrar, surgeon and obstetrician at Guy's Hospital. The painter Hugh Bellingham-Smith was her uncle.

She had an older brother and sister. Bellingham-Smith was a proficient ballet dancer and pianist. She gave up dancing, though, following an injury. Bellingham-Smith studied at the Slade School of Fine Art beginning in 1928. In 1931 she finished her studies at the Slade and married the English painter Rodrigo Moynihan.

Career
Works by Bellingham-Smith were exhibited in 1931 at the London Group. In 1948 she had a solo exhibition at Leicester Galleries and began exhibiting at the Royal Academy of Art. She painted primarily landscapes and still life. She worked for both Harper's Bazaar and Shell as an illustrator. She illustrated the children's book Candlelight Tales by Alison Uttley (Faber & Faber, 1936).

For the 1951 Festival of Britain the Arts Council commissioned 60 painters to make large paintings,  or more, to be displayed at the festival. There were also 12 commissioned sculptors. Ultimately the works were given to new hospitals, libraries, schools, and health centres that emerged after the war. There were five cash prizes awarded and Bellingham-Smith took one of the prizes with The Island.

M. H. Middleton reviewed the Leicester Galleries exhibition of Bellingham-Smith's paintings in November 1952:

Later in life, The Fens and East Anglia were featured in many of Bellingham-Smith's landscapes. During her career she exhibited at the Women's International Art Club.

Personal life
Bellingham-Smith and Moynihan had a son, John, who was born in 1932. The family had a governess for John and a cleaning lady for the upkeep of their home on Old Church Street. Bellingham-Smith and her husband had a busy social life. Their home became a salon to writers and other artists. In 1946, Princess Elizabeth was accompanied by her mother to the house six times to sit for Moynihan, who had been commissioned to make her portrait.

Their evenings were often spent smoking and drinking in restaurants, bars, clubs or at parties. When he turned 20, John went along with them on their evenings out. John wrote the book The Restless Lives: The Bohemian World of Rodrigo and Elinor Moynihan.

Their social life and Moynihan's affairs took a toll on the marriage. They separated in 1957 and divorced in 1960.

From about 1958, she lived in Boxford, Suffolk and died on 4 November 1988 in Ipswich.

Works
 A London Garden, Derbyshire & Derby School Library Service
 Brambles, Tullie House Museum and Art Gallery
 Bullrushes, Museums Sheffield
 Burning Stubble, Maidstone Museum & Art Gallery
 Dragon-Flies, 1947–48, Tate
 Essex Field in Summer, oil on canvas, about 1950. Sold at Christie's in 2002.
 Fields above Boxford, Government Art Collection
 Girls by the River, Newport Museum and Art Gallery
 Hedgerow, Government Art Collection
 Low Tide, Putney, Wolverhampton Arts and Heritage
 River Scene with Figures, Aberdeen Art Gallery & Museums
 Sunset, Arts Council Collection
 The Bonfire, Government Art Collection
 The Fenn, Boxford, Arts Council Collection
 The Island, Arts Council Collection
 The Log, oil on canvas. Sold at Christie's in 2006.
 The Sky over Wattisham, Arts Council Collection
 The Tabby Cat, oil on canvas, by 1949. Sold at Christie's in 1997.
 The Willow Tree, Harris Museum & Art Gallery
 Winter Afternoon,'' Arts Council Collection

Notes

References

Further reading
 
 
 
 
 

1906 births
1988 deaths
20th-century English painters
20th-century English women artists
Alumni of the Slade School of Fine Art
English women painters
Painters from London